Justice Krishnapillai Palakidnar was a leading Sri Lankan lawyer, judge and President of the Court of Appeal of Sri Lanka.

Early life and family
Palakidnar was born in 1931 at Kokuvil in northern Ceylon. He was the son of S. Krishnapillai, Chief Trains Controller, and Pasupathy. He was educated at Kokuvil Hindu College, Jaffna Hindu College and St. Joseph's College, Colombo. After school he joined the Ceylon University College, graduating with a  BA degree. He then entered Ceylon Law College, qualifying as an advocate of the Supreme Court in 1957.

Career
After qualifying Palakidnar practised law in Colombo as a junior under C. Renganathan. He joined the Judicial Service in 1966, serving as a magistrate in Anuradhapura, Ratnapura and Jaffna. He was then a District Judge in Kalmunai, Chavakachcheri and Jaffna. He served as a High Court Judge between 1982 and 1987, serving in Chilaw, Negombo, Batticaloa and Trincomalee. He was appointed to the Court of Appeal in 1987, becoming its president in October 1992.

Later life
After retirement Palakidnar was appointed chairman of the Special Commission on Disappearance in the North and East by President Chandrika Kumaratunga. He was director of the Human Rights Task Force. Palakidnar died on 2 June 2001.

References

1931 births
2001 deaths
Alumni of Ceylon Law College
Alumni of Jaffna Hindu College
Alumni of Kokkuvil Hindu College
Alumni of Saint Joseph's College, Colombo
Alumni of the Ceylon University College
Ceylonese advocates
District Courts of Sri Lanka judges
High Courts of Sri Lanka judges
People from Northern Province, Sri Lanka
Presidents of the Court of Appeal of Sri Lanka
Sri Lankan Tamil judges
Sri Lankan Tamil lawyers